William Thomas Hart (February 4, 1929 – January 17, 2023) was a United States district judge of the United States District Court for the Northern District of Illinois.

Education and career

Born in Joliet, Illinois, Hart received a Juris Doctor from Loyola University Chicago School of Law in 1951. He was in the United States Army from 1951 to 1953. He was an assistant United States attorney of the Northern District of Illinois from 1954 to 1956. He was in private practice in Chicago, Illinois from 1956 to 1982. He was a special assistant state attorney general of Illinois from 1957 to 1958. He was a special assistant state's attorney of Cook County, Illinois in 1960.

Federal judicial service

Hart was nominated by President Ronald Reagan on March 11, 1982, to a seat on the United States District Court for the Northern District of Illinois vacated by Judge John Powers Crowley. He was confirmed by the United States Senate on April 20, 1982, and received his commission on April 21, 1982. He assumed senior status on June 1, 1996, a position he held until his death on January 17, 2023.

References

Sources

William Thomas Hart's obituary

1929 births
2023 deaths
Judges of the United States District Court for the Northern District of Illinois
United States district court judges appointed by Ronald Reagan
20th-century American judges
United States Army officers
Loyola University Chicago School of Law alumni
Military personnel from Joliet, Illinois
Assistant United States Attorneys
21st-century American judges